The 1932 Michigan Tech Huskies football team represented Michigan Technological University as an independent during the 1932 college football season. The Huskies completed the season with a 4–1 record.

Schedule

References

Michigan Tech
Michigan Tech Huskies football seasons
Michigan Tech Huskies football